Kangaru (also Romanized as Kangarū; also known as Kangarūd) is a village in Rameshk Rural District, Chah Dadkhoda District, Qaleh Ganj County, Kerman Province, Iran. At the 2006 census, its population was 365, in 87 families.

References 

Populated places in Qaleh Ganj County